James Birrell Brown (7 June 1939 – 18 January 2015) was a Scottish footballer, who played as a wing half in the Scottish League for Dumbarton and in the English Football League for Darlington.

References

External links
 Profile at Dumbarton Football Club Historical Archive

1939 births
2015 deaths
Footballers from Stirling
Association football wing halves
Dumbarton F.C. players
Darlington F.C. players
Scottish Football League players
English Football League players
Scottish footballers
Alva Albion Rangers F.C. players